Otis L. Johnson (November 5, 1883 – November 9, 1915) was a Major League Baseball shortstop. In 71 career games, he had 49 hits in 209 at-bats, with 36 RBIs. He batted right and left and threw right-handed.

Johnson was born in Fowler, Indiana, and died in Johnson City, New York.

External links
Baseball Reference.com page

1883 births
1915 deaths
New York Highlanders players
Major League Baseball shortstops
Baseball players from Indiana
Dallas Giants players
Little Rock Travelers players
Portland Beavers players
Jersey City Skeeters players
Charleston Sea Gulls players
Rochester Hustlers players
Binghamton Bingoes players
Elmira Colonels players
St. Paul Apostles players
People from Fowler, Indiana
People from Johnson City, New York